Serf, also known as Son of a Rich is a 2019 Russian comedy film directed by Klim Shipenko. The plot follows a wealthy businessman's son who is made to believe he has traveled back to the time of serfdom in Russia, in order to reform his uncouth behaviour.
The film produced by Yellow, Black and White, starring Miloš Biković, with Aleksandra Bortich, Aleksandr Samoylenko, Ivan Okhlobystin, and Mariya Mironova.

It was theatrically released in Russia on 26 December 2019 by Central Partnership. 
A sequel, Serf 2, will be released on Central Partnership in December 2023.

Plot 
Grisha (Miloš Biković) is the son of the oligarch Pavel (Aleksandr Samoylenko). He is a spoiled youth who spends almost all the time in night clubs, has casual sex with women, and does whatever he wants with no consequences. One day Grisha gets into an accident with the police, and his father realizes that Grisha will continue to be more and more reckless and dangerous in faith that his father will save him from any punishment for his actions. Pavel begins to look for a way to change his son for the better. TV producer Anastasia (Mariya Mironova), Pavel's friend with benefits, invites him to contact Lev Arnoldovich, an eccentric psychologist, whose unusual methods may seem cruel and shocking, but almost always give a guaranteed result.

Soon Grisha gets into an accident arranged by his father and loses consciousness. He comes to in a stable in an abandoned village, located on a landowner's estate in the Russian Empire in the summer of 1860, six months before the abolition of serfdom. At first, Grisha thinks that this is a trick, but the surrounding reality is too real, the surrounding people too convincing — and now he is a disenfranchised serf, a horse groom, unable to perform his duties, because he is afraid of horses. Grisha tries to run away unsuccessfully and is dragged away to be hanged. He is saved only by the appearance of Aglaya (Olga Dibtseva), the daughter of a landowner, for the sake of whose name day the master (Oleg Komarov) pardons the fugitive. Trying to reason logically, Grisha at first vehemently denies the possibility of falling into the past, but then gradually comes to terms with the position of a serf.

In reality, the whole village of the 19th century turns out to be a skillful production of Anastasia and the psychologist Lev Arnoldovich, carried out with Pavel's money. The goal of the project is to completely change Grisha's view of the world around him and himself, for which the team is watching his every move. The project is not a perfect recreation of 1860s Russia, but because Grisha is too ignorant of basic Russian history to notice the many anachronisms around him, the project is not threatened.

The scriptwriter plans for Grisha to begin an affair with Aglaya, developing into a serf eloping with a "lady" and a complete reassessment of life attitudes, but Grisha does not seem to sympathize with the situation of a young woman forced to marry an older, rich landowner. Pavel, seeing no progress in Grisha's attitude, is enraged and plans to destroy the project. However, the project is saved unexpectedly: Grisha accidentally, out of the corner of her eye, remarks that the village girl Liza (Aleksandra Bortich), who had unsuccessfully jumped from a horse, seems to be wearing modern panties, and tries to look up her skirt. Seeing the reaction of those around him, Grisha suddenly realizes that he's gone too far, and for the first time in his life returns to the person offended by him to ask for forgiveness. The amazed Pavel agrees to continue the project.

Grisha proceeds to make a genuine connection with Liza.  The psychologist proposes to change the scenario and make Liza the object of Grisha's love. Liza despises Grisha, but she nevertheless agrees to help him change. Along the way, Grisha gradually changes his views on life and himself, watching his own sins manifest themselves in the "son of the lord, Alexey", played by Liza's real-life boyfriend Anton.

Aglaya's actress, Polina, offended by the loss of the "leading role", convinces Anton that Liza plans to begin an affair with Grisha. They begin to have sex, but are accidentally spotted by Liza and Grisha, who didn't expect incest from "Aglaya" and her brother "Alexey". The furious Lev Arnoldovich removes "Aglaya" and "Alexey" from the roles. In revenge, Polina reveals the project to the world, and says that "a man is being tortured". Police begin to investigate the project, aided by "Aglaya".

With only a few hours left until the police find the project, an emergency plan is made to once and for all change Grisha's attitude: the Golden Horde will invade 19th century Russia. Grisha doesn't notice this anachronism, and the "Golden Horde" kidnaps Liza. Grisha reverts to his selfish, cowardly ways and runs away, seemingly dooming the project. But then, he returns to fight off the "Tatar army", save Liza, and ride away on his horse, just minutes before the police arrive to find the project and take it for just a historical film set.

Grisha manages to make it to a gas station, but before he can understand what's happened, he is shot by a tranquillizer dart and falls asleep. Upon waking up, he is told that he fell into a coma for 3 months and there was no serf past and no village. While his character development remains, Grisha realizes this means that Liza was never real and becomes deeply depressed.

One day he meets Polina and Anton (the actors for Lady Aglaya and Lord Alexey) in a club, where, taking pity on him, they tell him the truth about the project and that Liza is in fact real. Liza and Grisha get together. Pavel and Anastasia get married.

In the last scene of the film, another oligarch's son is dragged into the "village" and being tricked into believing he has fallen into feudal Russia. Grisha watches on as part of the project's team.

Cast 
 Miloš Biković as Gregory 'Grisha' (also tr. Grigoriy) / Serf
 Aleksandra Bortich as Elizabeth 'Liza' (also tr. Elizaveta), a veterinarian, and an actress
 Aleksandr Samoylenko as Pavel, Grisha's father
 Ivan Okhlobystin as Lev, a psychologist, Anastasia's ex-husband
 Mariya Mironova as Anastasia (also tr. Anastasiya), a television producer
 Oleg Komarov as an actor, a.k.a. "master Dmitry Timofeev" (also tr. "Dmitriy Timofeev")
 Olga Dibtseva as Polina is an actress, a.k.a. "Aglaya Timofeeva, young lady", and "master Dmitry Timofeev's daughter"
 Kirill Nagiyev as Anton is an actor, a.k.a. "Alexey Barchuk, young master" (also tr. "Aleksey Barchuk")
 Sergey Sotserdotsky as Artyom is an actor, a.k.a. "Proshka's stable boy"
 Sophia Zayka as "Lyuba", an actress
 Mikhail Babichev as "Avdey Mikhalych", an executor with a whip, an actor
 Aleksandr Oblasov as Semyonov, inspector of the (traffic police) in Moscow
 Artur Vakha as police major, Pavel's buddy
 Andrey Malakhov as himself (cameo appearance)

Production

Filming
Principal photography began in August 2018, in Moscow and the urban-type settlement of Pushkinskiye Gory, Pushkinogorsky District, Pskov Oblast, Russia.

Release
Serf was released in the United States on 24 November 2019, and in the Russian Federation by Central Partnership on 26 December 2019.

Marketing
The film was first shown at the 4th Russian Film Week in London. The premiere took place in the famous British cinema Odeon Luxe Leicester Square, in the main hall, which seats 800 spectators.

Reception

Box office
The film was released in Russia on 26 December 2019, and in the first weekend of its screening put in more than 300 million rubles, and a total of 3.151 billion Russian rubles, which made it the most profitable film in Russian cinema. It is the most profitable Russian film of all time, with only Avatar grossing more (3.6 billion Russian rubles) in Russia's box office.

Critical response
According to critic A.V. Valley, Serf is a modern Russian hybrid of The Truman Show and the film Ivan Vasilyevich Changes His Profession.
Reviewers of various online publications such as Meduza Anton Dolin, 
Tsargrad TV (Yegor Kholmogorov), 
Around TV (Anna Entyakova), 
Weburg.net. (Kirill Ilyukhin), 
and the magazine Ogoniok (Andrey Arkhangelsky), rated the film positively.

Film critic of the portal Film.ru Vladislav Shuravin rated 7 out of 10. The observer also notes similarity with other films, namely with the Text (2019 film). Shuravin notes that among the New Year's films of recent years, Serf is the most «middling option».

Denis Stupnikov, a movie reviewer at the InterMedia information portal, gave the film 7 out of 10 points. The critic notes the director's ability to «balance on the razor’s edge, but not cross the line», as well as the fact that «Klim Shipenko tries not to rely on empty buffoonery, so even simple-minded jokes have a very deep context».

Yulia Troitskaya, a columnist for the Kanobu.ru entertainment site, gave the film average ratings, indicating that similar stories had already been seen (Frontier (2018 film), Black Hunters (2008 film)). But, according to the critic, the plot is most similar to the mini-series Back to the USSR, only Serf «does not consist of four  episodes, although the characters reveal the same pattern and come to the same finale». Also, Troitskaya did not appreciate the fact that the line of secondary heroes was not developed, therefore, «if they are deleted from history, nothing will change». In positive moments, Troitskaya recorded the soundtrack and the «good nature» of the picture.

Vera Alyonushkina, a critic of the movie section on the Russian version of Time Out, gave a negative assessment to the film. Noting some discrepancy between the age category and overkill with violent scenes, she rated the film two points out of five. According to Alyonushkina, the film could have been recorded in the category of forgettable comedies that were good for killing time, if not for one «but»: the reviewer was perturbed by the idea of violence as a correcting method for poor behavior like Grisha's. In particular, the final transformation of Grisha into gratitude towards his father and being the next person in the cycle of violence seemed too much like a reward for obedience: "do as I say although I abuse you and you'll be rewarded."

Sequels
In August 2022, the filming of the film Serf 2 started. The entire main cast and creative team of the first film is involved in the production of the film. The film is slated for release in December 2023.

References

External links 
 

2019 films
2010s Russian-language films
2019 comedy films
Russian comedy films
Films about actors
Films about time travel
Films about the Russian Empire
Films about technological impact
Films about games
Films about television
Films shot in Moscow
Films shot in Russia
Films directed by Klim Shipenko